The 2013–14 season is Yokohama FC Hong Kong's 2nd season in the Hong Kong First Division League. Yokohama FC Hong Kong will compete in the First Division League, Senior Challenge Shield and FA Cup.

Key events
 3 June 2013: Montenegrins defender Čedomir Mijanović leaves the club from fellow First Division club I-Sky Yuen Long for free.
 5 June 2013: Hong Kong defender Li Hang Wui joins the club from fellow First Division club Sunray Cave JC Sun Hei for an undisclosed fee.
 7 June 2013: Hong Kong midfielder Au Yeung Yiu Chung joins the club from fellow First Division club South China for free after his contract with South China expiries.
 7 June 2013: Hong Kong defender Li Shu Yeung joins the club from newly relegated Second Division club Wofoo Tai Po for free.
 7 June 2013: Hong Kong goalkeeper Cheung King Wah joins the club from fellow First Division club Sunray Cave JC Sun Hei for an undisclosed fee.
 7 June 2013: The club confirms the departure of Serbian midfielder Mirko Teodorović and Hong Kong defender Chan Siu Kwan and goalkeeper Tsang Man Fai.
 8 June 2013: Hong Kong defender Chu Ka Chun leaves the club and joins newly promoted First Division club Happy Valley for an undisclosed fee.
 11 June 2013: Hong Kong defender Leung Kwok Wai leaves the club and joins newly promoted First Division club Eastern Salon for free.
 11 June 2013: Hong Kong midfielder Chan Siu Kwan leaves the club and joins defending champions South China for an undisclosed fee.
 28 June 2013: Hong Kong goalkeeper Tsang Man Fai leaves the club and joins defending champions South China for an undisclosed fee.
 28 June 2013: Hong Kong forward Lo Kong Wai leaves the club and joins defending champions South China for an undisclosed fee.
 2 July 2013: Australian–Hongkonger defender Liu Stephen Garlock leaves the club and joins defending champions South China for an undisclosed fee.
 4 July 2013: South Korean defender Park Tae-Hong joins the club on loan from J.League Division 2 club Yokohama F.C. until 31 January 2014.
 4 July 2013: Japanese goalkeeper Taiki Murai has his loan from J.League Division 2 club Yokohama F.C. extended until 31 January 2014.
 9 July 2013: Chinese–Hongkonger striker Liang Zicheng joins the club from fellow First Division club Kitchee for an undisclosed fee.
 15 July 2013: Hong Kong midfielder Chan Chun Lok returns from England Brooke House College Football Academy and joins the club.
 15 July 2013: Hong Kong defender Leung Nok Hang, the younger brother of Leung Kwun Chung, returns from England Brooke House College Football Academy and joins the club.
 6 August 2013: Serbian midfielder Mirko Teodorović leaves the club and joins fellow First Division club Sunray Cave JC Sun Hei on a free transfer.
 27 August 2013: Japanese midfielder Shintaro Harada joins the club from USL Pro club Dayton Dutch Lions on an undisclosed fee.
 10 January 2014: Chinese-born Hong Kong midfielder Liang Zicheng leaves the club and joins fellow First Division club Eastern Salon for HK$15k.
 27 January 2014: Japanese midfielder Masaaki Ideguchi joins the club on loan from J.League Division 2 club Yokohama F.C. until the end of the season.
 31 January 2014: Japanese midfielder Shintaro Harada returns to his parent USL Pro club Dayton Dutch Lions after a 5-month loan spell at the club.

Players

Squad information

Transfers

In

Out

Loan In

Loan out

Club

Coaching staff

Squad statistics
Note: Voided matches are not counted in the statistics except disciplined records.

Overall Stats
{|class="wikitable" style="text-align: center;"
|-
!width="100"|
!width="60"|First Division
!width="60"|Senior Shield
!width="60"|FA Cup
!width="60"|Total Stats
|-
|align=left|Games played    ||  11 ||  1  || 0  || 13
|-
|align=left|Games won       ||  2  ||  0  || 0  || 2
|-
|align=left|Games drawn     ||  3  ||  0  || 0  || 3
|-
|align=left|Games lost      ||  7  ||  1  || 0  || 8
|-
|align=left|Goals for       ||  18 ||  1  || 0  || 19
|-
|align=left|Goals against   ||  24 ||  4  || 0  || 28
|- =
|align=left|Players used    ||  22 ||  13 || 0  || 221
|-
|align=left|Yellow cards    ||  35 ||  3  || 0  || 38
|-
|align=left|Red cards       ||  2  ||  0  || 0  || 2
|-

Players Used: Yokohama FC Hong Kong has used a total of 22 different players in all competitions.

Squad Stats

Top scorers

Disciplinary record
Includes all competitive matches. Players listed below made at least one appearance for Yokohama FC Hong Kong first squad during the season.

Substitution record
Includes all competitive matches.

Last updated: 26 February 2014

Captains

Competitions

Overall

First Division League

Classification

Results summary

Results by round

Matches

Pre-season friendlies

First Division League

Senior Shield

Notes

References

Yokohama FC Hong Kong seasons
Yoko